The Mümling is a river of Hesse and Bavaria, Germany. In Bavaria it is sometimes called Mömling in official documents. It is a left tributary of the Main.

Etymology 
The Romans named this river Nemaninga, and after it the Numerus Brittonum et exploratorum Nemaningensium unit in Obernburg. In the 9th century, this river was first mentioned with the name Mimininga. The name Mümling probably belongs to the so-called "pra-european hydronyms" as a twin-form of Neman River.

Cities near Mümling 
 Beerfelden
 Erbach
 Michelstadt
 
 Bad König
 
 Höchst im Odenwald
 Breuberg
 Mömlingen
 
 Obernburg

See also
List of rivers of Bavaria
List of rivers of Hesse

References

External links 

 Cycling trail "R1" Mümlingtal
 Water level at Michelstadt, water level at Hainstadt, HND Bayern
 Upper course and tributaries of the Mümling, Natura 2000 Hessen

Rivers of Hesse
Rivers of Bavaria
Rivers of Germany